Heart of Midnight may refer to:

 Heart of Midnight (film), 1988 horror film
 Heart of Midnight (novel), 1992 novel by J. Robert King set in the fictional world of Ravenloft